Seaforth is a district in the Metropolitan Borough of Sefton, Merseyside, England. Historically in Lancashire, it is north of Liverpool, between Bootle and Waterloo.

History

The name of Seaforth is thought to come from the Old Norse sæ-fjord, sæ-ford, "sea inlet". It was recorded as Safforde "sea ford" in 1128, suggesting Old English name origins. Another theory for the name of the area is that it was taken from Seaforth House, named after Francis Mackenzie, 1st Baron Seaforth, who built the mansion in 1813 for his daughter and her husband, Sir John Gladstone, father of William Ewart Gladstone, four times Prime Minister of the United Kingdom.

A permanent military presence was established in the borough with the completion of Seaforth Barracks in 1882.

Seaforth Dock opened in 1972 and is the largest dock facility on the River Mersey. It is part of the Port of Liverpool and Liverpool Freeport.

Governance
Seaforth joined Crosby Municipal Borough in 1937, having previously been part of Waterloo with Seaforth urban district. The whole of Crosby became part of the new Metropolitan Borough of Sefton on 1 April 1974.

From 1918 to 1950 Seaforth was within the Parliamentary constituency known as Waterloo, a safe seat for the Conservative Party, and then until 2010 within the Crosby constituency, whose MP from 1997 to 2010 was Claire Curtis-Thomas, of the Labour Party. Prior to her election the Crosby seat was generally considered a Conservative Party stronghold, like its predecessor seat, with Tory MPs elected at every election, except for the 1981 Crosby by-election, when Shirley Williams of the Social Democratic Party was elected. As a result of boundary revisions for the 2010 general election, the Crosby constituency was abolished and Seaforth was included in the expanded Bootle constituency, represented by the Labour MP Joe Benton.

For elections to Sefton Council, Seaforth is within the Church electoral ward and is represented by three councillors, all members of the Labour Party.

Geography

Seaforth is between Waterloo in the north, Litherland to the east, Bootle to the south, and the River Mersey and the Port of Liverpool to the west. It is mainly an area of Victorian terraced housing.

Transport
Seaforth is served by Seaforth and Litherland railway station on the Liverpool to Southport branch of Merseyrail's Northern Line. Principal roads include the A565 and the A5036.
.

Sport
Motorcycle speedway racing was staged at Seaforth Stadium in the late 1930s. 
Greyhound racing also took place until the 1960s

See also
Listed buildings in Great Crosby
Seaforth Battery

Notable people
 Ray Mia, Music producer & Capomaestro, Jacaranda Records
Roger Aindow, English former professional footballer
Kenny Everett, radio presenter and comedian, born in Seaforth
William Ewart Gladstone, prime minister
 Edmund Knowles Muspratt (1833—1923), chemical industrialist
 Max Muspratt (1872–1934), chemist & politician
 Julia Solly (1862–1953), British-born South-African feminist
 Nessie Stewart-Brown (1864–1958), feminist

References

External links

Seaforth, Liverpool Echo

Towns and villages in the Metropolitan Borough of Sefton